"Hurt So Bad" is a song written by Teddy Randazzo, Bobby Weinstein, and Bobby Hart. It is a 1965 Top 10 hit ballad originally recorded by Little Anthony & The Imperials. Linda Ronstadt also had a Top 10 hit with her cover version in 1980. The song has been re-recorded by numerous artists including The Lettermen, who took the song to number twelve in September 1969.

Little Anthony & The Imperials version

Background
Little Anthony & The Imperials' original version was taken from their album, Goin' out of My Head. It was the follow-up to that album's smash-hit title song, and like that song, also became a Billboard Top 10 hit as well as a Top Five R&B hit. This version reached number ten on the Billboard Hot 100, and number one in Canada. It was also performed by the group on their first appearance on The Ed Sullivan Show. It was written especially for The Imperials by Teddy Randazzo, a long-time friend of the group, along with Bobby Weinstein and Bobby Hart, and was produced by Don Costa for his DCP record label, later absorbed by United Artists Records and re-released on its Veep Records subsidiary. A powerful, dramatic ballad recording, it has become one of The Imperials' best-known songs, and has inspired numerous cover versions.

Personnel
"Little Anthony" Gourdine - lead vocals
Clarence "Wah-Hoo" Collins - baritone/bass
Ernest Wright - second tenor
Sammy Strain - first tenor
Producer: Don Costa
Backed by The 101 Strings Orchestra

El Chicano version

Background
El Chicano released a cover of "Hurt So Bad" on their 1970 debut album Viva Tirado. It was one of 9 songs on the album, including their first hit single "Viva Tirado".

Linda Ronstadt version

Background
Linda Ronstadt recorded a cover of "Hurt So Bad" for her Platinum-certified album, Mad Love, in 1980. Produced by Peter Asher on Asylum Records, it was released as the album's second single. Linda's version of the song featured a guitar solo by Danny Kortchmar. It stands as the most successful version ever recorded of the song, which peaked at #8 on the Billboard Hot 100 and #9 on the Cash Box Top 100 chart in the spring of 1980.  It was Ronstadt's final Top 10 hit on the Billboard Hot 100 as a solo artist.

Other versions
The song was covered by the following artists:
The Lettermen, and Jackie DeShannon 
Ramsey Lewis, The Delfonics, David Cassidy, Richard "Groove" Holmes, Grant Green, Willie Bobo, Nancy Wilson, Anne Renée (fr) (rendered in French as "Ça Fait Mal"), Nancy Holloway, Alicia Keys, and others.

References

1964 songs
1964 singles
1980 singles
Little Anthony and the Imperials songs
Jackie DeShannon songs
Linda Ronstadt songs
The Lettermen songs
Asylum Records singles
Songs written by Teddy Randazzo
Songs written by Bobby Hart
Songs written by Bobby Weinstein
Torch songs